Mycena adonis, commonly known as the scarlet bonnet, is a species of fungus in the family Mycenaceae. The fungus prefers to grow in conifer woods and peat bogs, suggesting a preference for acidic environments. The appearance of several atypical fruitings of Mycena adonis on deciduous wood in the Netherlands in the late 1970s was attributed to increases in atmospheric pollution that raised the acidity of the wood substrate. Mushrooms resembling M. adonis include M. acicula, M. aurantiidisca, and M. rosella.

Taxonomy
The species was first named Agaricus adonis in 1792 by Jean Baptiste François Pierre Bulliard, and placed in Mycena by Samuel Frederick Gray in 1821. Rolf Singer successively moved it to  Hemimycena (1943), then Marasmiellus (1951). Singer later changed his mind about these placements, and his 1986 Agaricales in Modern Taxonomy, he considered the species a Mycena; the binomials resulting from the prior generic transfers are synonyms.

The mushroom is commonly known as the "scarlet bonnet". Samuel Frederick Gray called it the "Adonis high-stool" in his 1821 Natural Arrangement of British Plants, while Mordecai Cubitt Cooke named it the "delicate Mycena".

Description

The cap initially has a sharply conic shape, but expands to a narrow bell-shape or a broad cone in maturity, typically reaching  in diameter. The cap margin, which is initially pressed against the stem, is opaque or nearly so at first. It is scarlet red when fresh and moist, becoming orange or yellowish orange before losing moisture. The mushroom is hygrophanous, and fades to an orange buff color when dry. The flesh is thin, the same color as the cap, fragile, and without any distinctive taste or odor. The gills are ascending-adnate (the gills attach at much less than a right angle, appearing to curve upward toward stem) or attached by a tooth, subdistant to close, with 14–16 gills reaching the stem. Additionally, there are two or three tiers of lamellulae—short gills that do not extend fully from the cap edge to the stem. The gills are narrow, and yellowish or with a reddish tinge at first; the margins are paler and the same color as the faces. It is tubular, fragile, initially pruinose (covered with a fine powder), polished and smooth with age, pale yellow, becoming whitish, with the base often dirty yellow or brownish. Mycena adonis mushrooms are inedible.

Microscopic characteristics
The spores are narrowly ellipsoid, nonamyloid, and measure 6–7 by 3–3.5 μm. The basidia (spore-bearing cells) are four-spored and measure 20–22 by 6–7 μm. The cheilocystidia and pleurocystidia (cystidia found on the edges and faces, respectively, of the gills) are abundant and similar in shape and markings, 40–58 by 10–15 μm, tapering somewhat on either end and usually with a long needle-shaped neck (which is branched in some). The cystidia are generally smooth, but when dried material is mounted in potassium hydroxide for observation under light microscopy, an amorphous substance apparently holds spores and debris around the neck or apex, making them appear encrusted. The flesh of the gill is very faintly vinaceous-brown when stained in iodine. The cap flesh has a thin, poorly differentiated pellicle with a region of slightly enlarged cells beneath it; the remainder is filamentous, and the filamentous portion stains vinaceous-brown in iodine.

Similar species

There are several other mycenas with which Mycena adonis could be confused.  is typically a smaller mushroom with a deep orange-red cap rather than the typical bright salmon-pink color of M. adonis. Since the colors and sizes of M. acicula and M. adonis are similar, a microscope is needed to reliably distinguish between them, with spore size and shape being different.  can be distinguished from M. adonis by its orange cap and amyloid spores.  can be distinguished from M. adonis by it lack of scarlet to pinkish tones in the cap and lack of gelatinized cortical hyphae. Mycena oregonensis is differentiated from M. adonis by its orange to yellow cap and lack of scarlet to pinkish tones. M. roseipallens has a smaller fruit body, wider spores, a less intensely colored and less conical cap, and grows on the decaying wood of elm, ash, and alder.

Ecology, habitat and distribution
The fruit bodies of Mycena adonis grow solitarily or in groups in conifer forests, and appear in the spring and autumn.  The fruit bodies grow in groups or scattered on needle beds under spruce and hemlock in the wet coastal conifer forests, or in the higher mountains, where it is not uncommon in the spring and autumn months. In one instance, fruit bodies were found growing on the deciduous trees Spanish Maple (Acer granatense) and willow (Salix alba) near Amsterdam, Holland. It was hypothesized that the bark of these trees had become more acid in recent years because of increasing atmospheric pollution (specifically, increases in the levels of sulfuric and nitric acid from industrial smoke), providing a more suitable substrate for the fungus.

The fungus is found in western North America, and in 2007, it was reported from the valley of the Ussuri River in the northeast of China. It is also found in Europe (Britain, Germany, Holland Scotland) and the Canary Islands. Mycena specialist Alexander H. Smith has found the species in Washington, Oregon, and California.

References

Cited text

adonis
Fungi of Asia
Fungi of Europe
Fungi of North America
Taxa named by Jean Baptiste François Pierre Bulliard
Fungi described in 1792